Scopula sincera is a moth of the  family Geometridae. It is found in Angola, Malawi, South Africa and Zambia.

References

Moths described in 1901
sincera
Insects of Angola
Moths of Africa